Abu Taher Mohammad Afzal (known as ATM Afzal) is a Bangladeshi jurist who served as the 8th Chief Justice of Bangladesh.

Career 
In 1976, Afzal was the public prosecutor at the trial of Colonel Abu Taher.

References 

Living people
Supreme Court of Bangladesh justices
Chief justices of Bangladesh
Year of birth missing (living people)
Place of birth missing (living people)
Dhaka College alumni